Palliodiaivayal is a village in the Pattukkottai taluk of Thanjavur district, Tamil Nadu, India.

Demographics 

As per the 2001 census, Palliodiaivayal had a total population of 441 with 213 males and 228 females. The sex ratio was 1070. The literacy rate was 66.64.

References 

 

Villages in Thanjavur district